Hypericum gentianoides is a species of flowering plant in the St. John's wort family Hypericaceae. Its common names include orangegrass and pineweed.

Native to eastern North America, it ranges from Ontario; Nova Scotia and Maine south to Florida, west to Texas, and north to Missouri and Minnesota.

It is an annual herb typically growing 10–40 cm tall. The leaves are repressed against the stem, 1-3mm long, and scale-like; an adaptation to reduce transpiration in exposed environments. The flowers are no more than 3mm across, with five to ten stamens, and three styles. It commonly grows in nutrient poor soil, sand, and on exposed sites, but is also known to occur in wetter areas such as coastal plain marshes. The name orangegrass refers to the citrus smell that is released when it is crushed. Chemical extracts of H. gentianoides have been found to inhibit the contraction of HIV.

References

gentianoides
Flora of North America